"Just a Little Bit of You" is a song from the 1975 Michael Jackson album titled Forever, Michael. The album was Jackson's fourth and was released when he was 16 years old. Produced by Brian Holland, "Just a Little Bit of You" became Jackson's biggest solo hit in three years reaching #23 on the U.S. Pop Singles chart and #4 on the Soul Singles chart. It was also the last Motown single released while Jackson was still signed to the label.

Charts

Personnel
Produced by Brian Holland
Lead vocals by Michael Jackson
Arrangement by James Anthony Carmichael

References

1975 singles
Michael Jackson songs
Songs written by Eddie Holland
Songs written by Brian Holland
Motown singles
Song recordings produced by Brian Holland
Song recordings produced by Edward Holland Jr.
1974 songs